The 1973 Yale Bulldogs football team represented Yale University in the 1973 NCAA Division I football season.  The Bulldogs were led by ninth-year head coach Carmen Cozza, played their home games at the Yale Bowl and finished tied for second place in the Ivy League with a 5–2 record, 6–3 overall.

Schedule

References

Yale
Yale Bulldogs football seasons
Yale Bulldogs football